The 1934 United States Senate special election in Nebraska took place on November 6, 1934. A regular election was held on the same day for the same seat. The incumbent Senator, Republican Robert B. Howell, died on March 11, 1933. William Henry Thompson, a Democratic politician, was appointed to the vacant seat. Richard C. Hunter was elected to finish Howell's term, defeating J. H. Kemp, while Edward R. Burke was elected to the next term.

Democratic primary

Candidates
Richard C. Hunter, lawyer and former State Senator

Results

Republican primary

Candidates
James Harvey Kemp, lawyer and former State Senator

Results

Results

References 

Nebraska 1934
Nebraska 1934
1934 Special
Nebraska Special
United States Senate Special
United States Senate 1934